Eva Paniagua (born 2 February 1974) is a Spanish hurdler. She competed in the women's 400 metres hurdles at the 1996 Summer Olympics.

References

1974 births
Living people
Athletes (track and field) at the 1996 Summer Olympics
Spanish female hurdlers
Olympic athletes of Spain
Place of birth missing (living people)